The  Dallas Cowboys season was their sixth in the National Football League and their best record to date, at 7–7. After five consecutive losses, Dallas was 2–5 halfway through the season. They won five of the final seven games and finished in a tie for second place in the Eastern Conference, with the New York Giants, four games behind the defending NFL champion Cleveland Browns (11–3).

The Cowboys defeated the Giants twice and earned the berth in the third place Playoff Bowl in Miami, held three weeks after the regular season, but lost 35–3 to the Baltimore Colts, runners-up of the Western Conference.

Schedule

Conference opponents are in bold text

Postseason

Standings

NFL Draft

Roster

References

Dallas Cowboys seasons
Dallas Cowboys
Dallas Cowboys